Francisco María Aguilera González (April 27, 1918 – August 5, 2010) was a Mexican Bishop of the Roman Catholic Church

Aguilera González was born in Guanajuato and was ordained a priest April 11, 1943. He was appointed Auxiliary Bishop of the Archdiocese of Mexico on June 5, 1979, along with titular bishop of Macriana in Mauretania, and was ordained a bishop on August 15, 1979. Aguilera González retired from the Archdiocese of Mexico on June 12, 1996.

See also
Archdiocese of Mexico

External links
Catholic-Hierarchy
Mexico Archdiocese 

1918 births
2010 deaths
20th-century Roman Catholic bishops in Mexico